The 1969–70 season was the 68th in the history of the Western Football League.

The champions for the third time in their history were Glastonbury.

League table
The league was increased from 19 to 20 clubs after no clubs left and one new club joined:

Weymouth Reserves, rejoining the league after leaving in 1967.

References

1969-70
5